Richard M. Christensen is an American academic writer.

Biography
Christensen completed his D.Eng. from Yale University in 1961.

Christensen began his career at the University of California, Berkeley. In 1967, he left his teaching job and joined Shell plc as a research engineer. Later, he again joined academia and was affiliated with universities such as the University of Houston and Washington University.

In 1988, he joined UC Davis and served as a professor until July 1994, when he became a professor research emeritus at Stanford University.

In 1987, he was elected as a member of the National Academy of Engineering.

In 2013, he received Timoshenko Medal.

His book, The Theory of Materials Failure has been reviewed by Contemporary Physics.

Awards
 Worcester Reed Warner Gold Medal (1988)
 William Prager Medal
 Timoshenko Medal (2013)

Books
 Theory of viscoelasticity: an introduction (1971)
 The Theory of Materials Failure (2013)

References

Living people
20th-century American academics
Members of the United States National Academy of Engineering
Year of birth missing (living people)
Yale School of Engineering & Applied Science alumni
UC Berkeley College of Engineering faculty
Shell plc people
University of California, Davis faculty
Stanford University faculty